DNA dC->dU-editing enzyme APOBEC-3H, also known as Apolipoprotein B mRNA-editing enzyme catalytic polypeptide-like 3H or APOBEC-related protein 10, is a protein that in humans is encoded by the APOBEC3H gene.

Function 

This gene encodes a member of the apolipoprotein B mRNA-editing enzyme catalytic polypeptide (APOBEC) family of proteins. The encoded protein is a cytidine deaminase that has antiretroviral activity by generating lethal hypermutations in viral genomes. Polymorphisms and alternative splicing in this gene influence its antiretroviral activity and are associated with increased resistance to human immunodeficiency virus type 1 infection in certain populations. There are only one to two members of this family of genes in nonprimate mammals but at least seven members in primates. APOBEC3H is an antiviral effector.  In Old world monkeys APOBEC3H has efficient antiviral activity against primate lentiviruses and it is sensitive to inactivation by the simian immunodeficiency virus Vif protein, and is capable of hypermutating retroviral genomes. The typical human APOBEC3H gene is inherently poorly expressed in primate cells and is ineffective at inhibiting retroviral replication. Importantly, different people have different strengths and potencies of APOBEC3H. People with version of the gene for APOBEC3H which produce stable variations of the protein can successfully limit HIV-1's ability to replicate.

References

Further reading

External links 
 

EC 3.5.4